Sobhi Saïed (born 26 September 1982) is a Tunisian handball player for Al-Gharafa and the Tunisian national team.

He participated on the Tunisia national team at the 2016 Summer Olympics in Rio de Janeiro, in the men's handball tournament.

References

External links

1982 births
Living people
Tunisian male handball players
Olympic handball players of Tunisia
Handball players at the 2016 Summer Olympics
People from Moknine
Expatriate handball players
Tunisian expatriate sportspeople in Qatar
Competitors at the 2009 Mediterranean Games
Mediterranean Games bronze medalists for Tunisia
Mediterranean Games medalists in handball
21st-century Tunisian people
20th-century Tunisian people